Tarfu or TARFU may refer to:

Tarfu Lake, a lake of Yukon, Canada
TARFU, an acronym for "Totally and Royally Fucked Up" or "Things Are Really Fucked Up"; see Military slang
Seaman Tarfu, a brother of cartoon character Private Snafu